The saddled moray eel (Gymnothorax conspersus) is a moray eel found in the western Atlantic Ocean. It was first named by Felipe Poey in 1867.

References

saddled moray
Fauna of the Southeastern United States
Fish of the Western Atlantic
saddled moray